Hicham Faik (born 19 March 1993) is a Dutch professional footballer who plays as a midfielder for Saudi club Al-Ahli.

Club career
The left-footed midfielder formerly played for Almere City and moved to Roda JC on a free in 2014. He joined Excelsior on a 2-year contract in summer 2016 after Roda released him. On 9 April 2018, it was announced Faik had signed a three-year deal with Belgian First Division A side Zulte Waregem.

On 6 September 2022, Faik joined Al-Ahli on a one-year deal.

Personal life
Faik is of Moroccan descent.

Honours

Club
Al-Faisaly
King Cup: 2020–21

References

External links
 
 Voetbal International profile 

1993 births
Living people
Footballers from The Hague
Dutch sportspeople of Moroccan descent
Association football midfielders
Dutch footballers
Dutch expatriate footballers
Almere City FC players
Roda JC Kerkrade players
Excelsior Rotterdam players
S.V. Zulte Waregem players
SC Heerenveen players
Al-Faisaly FC players
Al-Ahli Saudi FC players
Eredivisie players
Eerste Divisie players
Saudi Professional League players
Saudi First Division League players
Dutch expatriate sportspeople in Saudi Arabia
Expatriate footballers in Saudi Arabia
Dutch expatriate sportspeople in Belgium